Sarah Konrad (born August 26, 1967) is an American former biathlete. She competed in two events at the 2006 Winter Olympics. She also competed in the cross-country skiing at the same Olympics. Konrad was the first woman to represent the United States in two different sports at the same Winter Olympic Games. Since retiring, Konrad has served as a representative for the Athletes Advisory Council of the United States Olympic Committee and the United States Biathlon Association for the International Competition Committee.

Biography
Konrad was born in Los Angeles, California, and attended The Thacher School in Ojai. In 1988, she enrolled on ski program whilst at Dartmouth College. In 1998, Konrad won two golds and a silver at the Masters World Cup event in Lake Placid, New York. The following year, she was ranked as the ninth-best female cross-country skier in the United States. Konrad competed in all the Biathlon World Championships events from 2005 to 2007. She competed in the Olympic trials in Fort Kent, Maine to qualify for the 2006 Winter Olympics. After she retired, she moved back to Laramie, Wyoming to complete a PhD in geology at the University of Wyoming. She was also the oldest female Olympian to represent the United States at the 2006 Winter Games.

In 2014, Konrad, as a glaciologist, was part of an educational video, titled "Science of Snow" for NBC. Konrad undertook an experiment on freezing water and explained how snow relates to Nordic skiing. In 2016, Konrad also worked with the World Anti-Doping Agency, following doping amongst Russian athletes. Konrad then became the United States representative at the 2014 Winter Olympics, to ensure that none of the US team break any Olympic rules.

In 2022, Konrad became a director of US Biathlon.

Cross-country skiing results
All results are sourced from the International Ski Federation (FIS).

Olympic Games

World Championships

World Cup

Season standings

References

External links
 

1967 births
Living people
Biathletes at the 2006 Winter Olympics
Cross-country skiers at the 2006 Winter Olympics
American female biathletes
American female cross-country skiers
Olympic biathletes of the United States
Olympic cross-country skiers of the United States
Sportspeople from Los Angeles
21st-century American women